The Kearny Cottage is a historic home in Perth Amboy, Middlesex County, New Jersey, United States. It is open to the public as a historic house museum and is operated by Kearny Cottage Historical Society.

Built in 1781, it was originally located on High Street but was moved to Sadowski Parkway when the last Kearny descendant died in the 1920s.  The building was later moved again to where it now stands at 63 Catalpa Avenue, just inland from the mouth of the Raritan River. The four-room cottage is a museum operated by Kearny Cottage Historical Society and serves as a repository for many items donated by citizens of Perth Amboy reflecting the maritime history of its owners and the city. A colonial garden is located on the grounds.

The cottage was home Elizabeth Lawrence Kearny, the poet Lady Scribblerus, and Michael Kearny. Their son, Lawrence Kearny was born and died in the house. Commodore Kearny was famous for his open door trade policy with China and he was known as “the Sailor Diplomat.”

The house is listed on the New Jersey Register of Historic Places and National Register of Historic Places as the Lawrence Kearny House

See also
List of the oldest buildings in New Jersey
National Register of Historic Places listings in Middlesex County, New Jersey

References

External links
 
 Kearny Cottage - official site

Perth Amboy, New Jersey
Houses on the National Register of Historic Places in New Jersey
Historic house museums in New Jersey
Museums in Middlesex County, New Jersey
Houses in Middlesex County, New Jersey
Houses completed in 1781
National Register of Historic Places in Middlesex County, New Jersey
New Jersey Register of Historic Places
1781 establishments in New Jersey